Jennifer Batten (born November 29, 1957) is an American guitarist who has worked as a session musician and solo artist. From 1987 to 1997 she played on all three of Michael Jackson's world tours, and from 1999 to 2001 she toured and recorded with Jeff Beck.

Batten has released three studio albums: her 1992 debut, Above Below and Beyond (produced by former Stevie Wonder guitarist Michael Sembello), the worldbeat-influenced Jennifer Batten's Tribal Rage: Momentum in 1997, and Whatever, which was released on CD and DVD in Japan in 2007 and worldwide in 2008.

Early years
Batten began to play guitar at the age of eight when her father bought her a "killer red and blue electric". Her early influences were the Beatles, B.B. King, Lightnin' Hopkins, and Jeff Beck.

Batten started to experiment with the two-handed tapping technique in 1978, having been inspired by Guitar Institute of Technology classmate Steve Lynch (who ended up playing for the band Autograph) while attending the Musicians Institute.

Musical career
Batten has appeared on recordings such as Jeff Beck's Who Else! (1999) and You Had It Coming (2001), and Michael Sembello's Heavy Weather (1992). Her music video appearances include Jeff Beck ("Live in Japan"), Michael Jackson's "Moonwalker" ("Come Together"), Natalie Cole ("Wild Women Do"), and Sara Hickman's "Take It Like a Man" and Miguel Mateos' "Obsesión".

Batten played lead guitar and rhythm guitar on Michael Jackson's Bad (1987–1989), Dangerous (1992) and HIStory (1996–1997) world tours, and on his 1993 Super Bowl halftime performance, which was aired to over 1.3 billion people in 86 countries, the largest audience in television history for a live music performance. She was in Jeff Beck's touring band for three years starting in 1999, and appears on his albums Who Else! (1999) and You Had It Coming.

Between 1994 and 1999 Batten worked with Dave Rodgers and Domino as featured guitarist on the Eurobeat songs "Sun City", "Music For the People", "Fly" and "Woa Woa Woa." Her writing and performing is uncredited on several other songs under the A-Beat C label. Her live Eurobeat appearances were limited to playing at the Tokyo Dome with Rodgers and Queen of Hearts.

In 2010 she recorded a solo for the song "Bad Girls" by Polish singer Doda.

She partnered on a melodic rock CD with vocalist Marc Scherer and producer Jim Peterik (formerly of Survivor) which was released in September 2017, entitled BattleZone. All songs were written or co-written by Peterik. Special guests included saxophonist Mindi Abair and Chicago vocalist Bill Champlain. The song "Space and Time" was co-written with John Wetton, and "All Roads" was co-written with Sammy Hagar.  Batten made videos for all songs on her YouTube channel.

Other work
Batten has written two music books: Two Hand Rock (published by Hal Leonard) and The Transcribed Guitar Solos of Peter Sprague (self-published). She also has three DVD/download courses available from TrueFire: Rock Sauce for Lead Guitar, Rock Sauce for Rhythm Guitar, and 50 Ultra Intervallic Guitar Licks You Must Know.

In 2019, Batten worked with Rodrigo Teaser for a tribute to Michael Jackson ten years after his death, titled 10 years without Michael Jackson. For this show, Batten was joined LaVelle Smith Jr., who was Jackson's choreographer and dancer for more than 20 years.

Awards and recognition
In November 2011, Batten was featured on BBC Radio 4's series Joan Armatrading's More Guitar Favourites.

Her work was given the "She Rocks Icon Award" in January 2016.

Personal life
Batten enjoys creating stained and fused glass art, and steampunk art.

Discography

Solo albums
1992: Above Below and Beyond
1997: Jennifer Batten's Tribal Rage: Momentum
2007: Whatever

Guest appearances
1990: Shortstop – Sara Hickman (Elektra)
1990: Girl's Life – The Rainbow Girls (Red Distribution)
1990: Obsesion – Miguel Mateos (Sony BMG)
1991: Small Town Girl – Cindy Cruse (Frontline Records)
1992: Heavy Weather – Michael Sembello (Polydor)
1993: Guitar's Practicing Musicians – various artists (Guitar Recordings)
1994: Sunlight Again – Carl Anderson (GRP Records)
1995: Earthtones – Thom Teresi (Rhombus)
1995: Guitar Zeus – Carmine Appice (No Bull Records)
1995: The Immigrants - One Planet Under One Groove (USG/ZYX)
1997: Einstein Was a Bullfighter – Doc Tahri (Sumething Else)
1999: Who Else! – Jeff Beck (Epic)
2001: You Had It Coming, Jeff Beck, (Epic)
2003: Lost Years – Michael Sembello (Frontiers Records)
2005: All Star Tribute to Cher (Cleopatra)
2004: Live in Bucharest: The Dangerous Tour
2005: Secondhand Smoke - A Tribute to Frank Marino (Wildmess Records)
2008: Clean – Dave Martone (Magna Carta)
2009: Unexpected Fate – Bulldozer (Scarlet)
2010: It's Important – Dino Fiorenza (Fog Foundation)
2011: Glenn Eric – Glenn Eric Meganck (Beachfront)
2011: Japan Live 1999, Jeff Beck (IMV Blueline)
2011: Embrace the Sun - Japan Benefit Album (Lion Music)
2012: Live at Wembley July 16, 1988, Michael Jackson (Epic)
2017: Battle Zone – Scherer/Batten (Melodic Rock Records)
2018: Rainbow Rocket Ride – Svenson (Route Note)
2019: Brand New Start - Black Sand (Black Sand Records)
2021: Legend of Valley Doom Part 3 - Marius Danielsen's Legend of Valley Doom (guitar solo on track 8: "The Sarlinian Bow")

References

External links

Joan Armatrading: More Guitar Favourites - Jennifer Batten
Jennifer Batten Interview - NAMM Oral History Library (2016)

American rock guitarists
American session musicians
Living people
Musicians Institute alumni
20th-century American women guitarists
20th-century American guitarists
21st-century American women guitarists
21st-century American guitarists
1957 births
East West Records artists